Theodore Hill may refer to:

Ted Hill (mathematician) (Theodore Preston Hill, born 1943), U.S. mathematician
Theodore Hill (Australian politician), Electoral district of Oxley
Theodore Hill (American politician), member of the 38th New York State Legislature

See also
Ted Hill (disambiguation)